Dyella lipolytica is a Gram-negative, aerobic, lipolytic, rod-shaped, non-spore-forming and non-motile bacterium from the genus of Dyella which has been isolated from soil from the Dinghushan Biosphere Reserve in China.

References

External links
Type strain of Dyella lipolytica at BacDive -  the Bacterial Diversity Metadatabase

Xanthomonadales
Bacteria described in 2017